Pay-to-publish can refer to:
 Open-access journal publishing
 Vanity presses
 Self-publishing